Alexandru Pașcenco (born 28 May 1989) is a Moldavian footballer who currently plays as a midfielder for FC Florești and the Moldova national football team.

Career
In February 2014 Pașcenco signed a 3.5-year contract with Armenian Premier League side FC Ararat Yerevan.

On 11 June 2014, Zimbru Chișinău announced the signing of Pașcenco

At the end of June 2016 he signed with the Bulgarian team FC Vereya.

In 2019, Pașcenco joined FC Florești.

Honours
Zimbru Chișinău
Moldovan Super Cup (1): 2014

References

External links
 
 
 
 
 Alexandru Pașcenco at divizianationala

1989 births
Living people
Moldovan footballers
Moldova international footballers
Moldovan Super Liga players
Armenian Premier League players
Persian Gulf Pro League players
FC Sheriff Tiraspol players
FC Tiraspol players
FC Vereya players
FC Dacia Chișinău players
FC Tighina players
CS Tiligul-Tiras Tiraspol players
FC Rapid Ghidighici players
FC Ararat Yerevan players
FC Zimbru Chișinău players
Naft Masjed Soleyman F.C. players
FC Academia Chișinău players
FC Dinamo-Auto Tiraspol players
FC Sfîntul Gheorghe players
First Professional Football League (Bulgaria) players
Association football midfielders
FC Florești players
Moldovan expatriate footballers
Moldovan expatriate sportspeople in Armenia
Expatriate footballers in Armenia
Moldovan expatriate sportspeople in Iran
Expatriate footballers in Iran
Moldovan expatriate sportspeople in Bulgaria
Expatriate footballers in Bulgaria